Metelin may refer to:

Metelin, Hrubieszów County
Metelin, Kraśnik County

People with the surname
Johannes Metelin, printer associated with Heinrich Eggestein

See also
Mytilene